The 2020 Arkansas Razorbacks softball team represented the University of Arkansas in the 2020 NCAA Division I softball season. The Razorbacks played their home games at Bogle Park.

Previous season

The Razorbacks finished the 2019 season 38–20 overall, and 12–12 in the SEC to finish in a tie for sixth in the conference. The Razorbacks went 0–2 in the Stillwater Regional during the   2019 NCAA Division I softball tournament.

Preseason

SEC preseason poll
The SEC preseason poll was released on January 15, 2020.

Schedule and results

Source:
*Rankings are based on the team's current ranking in the NFCA poll.

February

Troy Cox Classic

The Razorbacks opened their 2020 season with a road trip to Las Cruces, New Mexico for the 2020 playing of the Troy Cox Classic, hosted by the New Mexico State Aggies, which started Friday, February 7. Arkansas received preseason rankings of #17 by Softball America and Flo Softball, #20 by USA Softball, #21 by D1 Softball, and #24 by NFCA. First pitch on opening day was at 9:30 a.m. CST (8:30 a.m. local MST) against the UTEP Miners. The Razorbacks won their first game of the year in run rule fashion, defeating the Miners in five innings. Arkansas' Autumn Storms spent four innings on the mound, tossing 52 pitches, while Jenna Bloom threw 20 pitches to get the final three outs. For the Miners, Allie Johnson spent the entire contest in the circle, throwing 183 pitches. The Lady Hogs put up one run apiece in the first and second innings before scoring three in the third to extend the lead to 5–0. Another two runs scored in the fourth before freshman Rylin Hedgecock, pinch hitting, ended the contest with a run rule three-run home run, the game's only homer.

The Razorbacks continued their tournament schedule with a doubleheader against the Bradley Braves, with the first game starting on Friday at 2:00 p.m. and the second on Saturday at 11:00 a.m. Friday's contest saw the Hogs suffer their first defeat of the season, by a margin of a single run. The Hogs opened the scoring in the first inning off of a Hannah McEwen RBI, and the score remained 1–0 until the bottom of the fourth, when a defensive error cost the Hogs two runs and the lead. The Braves extended their lead in the next inning by virtue of a wild pitch, making the score 3–1. Although the Razorbacks attempted to mount a comeback in the seventh and final inning, it fell barely short, and the Braves picked up the victory, 3–2. Both teams utilized only one pitcher for the entire game—Arkansas stuck with Mary Haff, who threw 72 pitches, while Bradley stayed with Emma Jackson, who tossed 131.

The rematch with Bradley opened the Hogs' second day of tournament play, and they took full advantage of it. Arkansas jumped out to a 4–0 lead in the first inning, via a Kayla Green RBI and a Linnie Malkin three-run homer. The lead was extended to 8–0 with four more runs in the third inning by way of a bases loaded hit by pitch and a three-run RBI double from Sydney Parr. A couple wild throws allowed the Braves to plate a run in the top of the fourth in unearned fashion, though the Razorbacks responded with another four-run inning, extending the lead to 12–1. A scoreless fifth inning from the Braves' offense triggered the end of the game, giving the Lady Hogs their second win of the year, both in run rule fashion. Autumn Storms picked up her second decision of the year after throwing 43 pitches over three innings; she was assisted by Jenna Bloom, who completed two innings in just 32 pitches. For the Braves, Morgan Radford tossed 71 in the first three innings; she was relieved by Grace French, who completed the fourth and final inning in 35 pitches.

The Hogs' fourth tournament game was against the hosts, New Mexico State; first pitch was on Saturday at 4:30 p.m. Arkansas fell behind early, surrendering three runs in the second inning, all by way of solo homers. Arkansas responded in the fifth, as Braxton Burnside sent a single to center field that drove home a run. In the sixth, the Hogs plated another, this one from Audrie LaValley's infield single. Arkansas kept it up in the seventh, as they took their first lead of the contest, 4–3, from Danielle Gibson's two-run homer, which was immediately followed by Linnie Malkin's solo home, her second of the day. In the circle, Autumn Storms earned her third win of the year, throwing 39 pitches in  innings. The Aggies relied largely on Matalasi Faapito, who delivered 94 pitches in her six innings of play. She was relieved during the seventh inning by Chloe Rivas, who delivered the last three outs in 20 pitches.

The Hogs' fifth and final tournament game was against Nebraska; first pitch was on Sunday at 9:00 a.m. The Razorbacks' offense got off to their best start yet to close out the Troy Cox Classic, as they plated five runs (including a two RBIs driven home by Linnie Malkin and a Ryan Jackson home run) in the first inning alone. This was followed by a seven-run second inning that saw Danielle Gibson tally one RBI and Ryan Jackson drive home two more before Audrie LaValley recorded the Lady Hogs' first grand slam of the year to make it 12–0. Nebraska's offense responded in the bottom of the third with a pair of home runs to narrow the lead to nine. Arkansas would not be fazed; Braxton Burnside stepped up in the fourth and drilled a three-run home run to increase the lead to 15–3. Nebraska tallied a solo home run in the fifth, but was unable to do anything more and the Hogs won their third run rule contest by a margin of 15–4. Mary Haff tallied her first win of the year, having thrown 25 pitches in  innings. She was assisted in the circle by Jenna Bloom, who tossed 45 in  innings, and Rylin Hedgecock, who threw 18 in one inning of play. For the Cornhuskers, Lindsey Walljasper received the decision after throwing 75 pitches in  innings. The other  were played by Courtney Wallace, who threw 82 pitches in total.

FGCU Invitational

Just five days after concluding play in New Mexico, the Hogs were set to begin another five-game tournament slate, this time in Fort Myers, Florida at the FGCU Invitational, hosted by the Florida Gulf Coast Eagles. Arkansas was scheduled to open with a 2:30 p.m. contest against Memphis on Friday, February 14. Later that day, the Razorbacks were set to take the diamond again to face the tournament's hosts, the FGCU Eagles, at 7:00 p.m. However, earlier that day, it was announced that these games had been cancelled and would not be made up.

The Hogs have two games slated for Saturday: at 10:00 a.m., Arkansas will take on the Furman Paladins, followed by a 2:30 p.m. matchup with the UIC Flames.

To conclude the tournament, Arkansas will again face FGCU; first pitch is scheduled for 12:30 p.m. on Sunday.

Razorback Invitational

The Razorbacks will open at home on Thursday, February 20, with the first match of the Razorback Invitational against the Boston University Terriers. First pitch will be at Bogle Park in Fayetteville at 4:30 p.m.

Day 2 of the tournament will see the Hogs take on South Dakota State at 2:30 p.m. and Marist at 4:45 p.m.

Saturday's slate includes two more matchups for the Lady Razorbacks - they will face Boston University again at 12:15 p.m., and will take on Montana afterwards at 2:30 p.m.

Arkansas will wrap up the Razorback invitational with a second game against Marist; this one on Sunday, February 23 at 11:45 a.m.

Woo Pig Classic

Just four days after concluding play at their first tournament, the Lady Razorbacks will be back out on the diamond to open their second tournament of the month, starting a slate of six games at the Woo Pig Classic. The opening game will begin at 4:30 p.m. on Thursday, February 27 against the Baylor Lady Bears.

As with the Razorback Invitational, the Woo Pig Classic will feature an Arkansas doubleheader on Friday: the Hogs play Villanova at 4:45 p.m. and Kent State to finish the night at 7:00 p.m.

Saturday will see two more matchups for the Lady Razorbacks. At 4:45 p.m., Arkansas will play host to Florida State, and a 7:00 p.m. rematch with Villanova will follow.

Arkansas will conclude their fourth and final tournament of the month on Sunday, March 1, when they take on Kent State at 12:15 p.m.

Rankings

References

Arkansas
Arkansas Razorbacks softball seasons
Arkansas Razorbacks softball